China Airlines Flight 811 was a flight that crash-landed in Manila International Airport in February 27, 1980.

Accident
China Airlines Flight 811 (flight number IATA: CI811, ICAO: CAL811, call sign: DYNASTY 811) was a scheduled international flight from Chiang Kai Shek Airport to Manila International Airport operated by China Airlines. On February 27, 1980, the flight was operated by a Boeing 707-309C. During landing, the aircraft landed 50 meters short of the runway threshold, causing the landing gear to break and catch fire. Of the 135 people on board, two died.

Aircraft
The aircraft involved was a Boeing 707-309C built at the Boeing Field , Washington in 1969 with serial number 20262 and model serial number 830 . The first flight of the machine took place on November 26, 1969, on December 11, 1969 it was delivered to China Airlines with the aircraft registration B-1826 . The four -engine long - haul aircraft was equipped with four Pratt & Whitney JT3D-3B turbofan engines.

Crew
Captain Wu Gong had 30 years of flight experience, while the first officer had 15 years of flight experience.

References

External links
 Unfallbericht B-707-309C, B-1826 =https://aviation-safety.net/database/record.php?id=19800227-0 |date=20220407010520 }}, Aviation Safety Network
 Crash of a Boeing 707-309C in Manila: 2 killed https://www.baaa-acro.com/crash/crash-boeing-707-309c-manila-2-killed |date=20220620173915 }}, B3A – Bureau of Aircraft Accident Archives
 Betriebsgeschichte der Maschine und Produktionsliste =https://rzjets.net/aircraft/?page=30&typeid=42 |date=20220329115853 }}, rzjets.net

China Airlines accidents and incidents
1980 in the Philippines